The Fable of the Small Town Favorite Who Was Ruined by Too Much Competition is a 1916 American short comedy silent film, the director unnamed and written by George Ade. It was released in cinemas on July 12, 1916, in the United States.

References

External links

1916 comedy films
1916 films
1916 short films
Silent American comedy films
American silent short films
American black-and-white films
American comedy short films
1910s English-language films
1910s American films